Escadron de Transport 3/61 Poitou is a French Air and Space Force training unit located at Orléans – Bricy Air Base, Loiret, France which operates transport aircraft.

See also

 List of French Air and Space Force aircraft squadrons

References

French Air and Space Force squadrons